Anne-Laure Viard (born 7 June 1981) is a French sprint canoeist who has competed since the mid-2000s. Competing in two Summer Olympics, she won a bronze medal in the K-2 500 m event at Beijing in 2008.

Viard also won three bronze medals at the ICF Canoe Sprint World Championships (K-1 200 m: 2009, K-2 500 m: 2005, 2007).

She is competing with partner Marie Delattre.

Gallery

References
Canoe09.ca profile

Sports-reference.com profile

1981 births
Canoeists at the 2004 Summer Olympics
Canoeists at the 2008 Summer Olympics
French female canoeists
Living people
Olympic canoeists of France
Olympic bronze medalists for France
Olympic medalists in canoeing
ICF Canoe Sprint World Championships medalists in kayak
Medalists at the 2008 Summer Olympics
Mediterranean Games bronze medalists for France
Mediterranean Games medalists in canoeing
Competitors at the 2005 Mediterranean Games